Johny Halsdorf (born 24 July 1934) is a Luxembourgian footballer. He played in twelve matches for the Luxembourg national football team from 1955 to 1959.

References

External links
 

1934 births
Living people
Luxembourgian footballers
Luxembourg international footballers
Place of birth missing (living people)
Association footballers not categorized by position